The following is an incomplete list of organisations featured in works of wuxia fiction. The organisations are classified under the wuxia novels in which they appear in.

Works of Jin Yong

 Demi-Gods and Semi-Devils
 Beggars' Gang (丐幫)
 Shaolin School (少林派)
 Duan family of Dali (大理國段氏)
 Murong family of Gusu (姑蘇幕容氏)
 Lingjiu Palace (靈鷲宮)
 Mantuo Manor (曼陀山莊)
 Heroes' Gathering Manor (聚賢莊)
 Carefree School (逍遙派)
 Xingxiu School (星宿派)
 Deaf Mute School (聾啞門)
 Lords of the 36 Caves and 72 Islands (三十六洞七十二島)
 Limitless Sword School (無量劍派)
 Penglai School (蓬萊派)
 Qingcheng School (青城派)
 First Class Hall of Western Xia (西夏一品堂)
 Funiu School (伏牛派)
 Yizihui Sword School (一字慧劍門)
 Dalun Monastery (大輪寺)
 Qin Family Fort (秦家寨)

 The Legend of the Condor Heroes
 Beggars' Gang (丐幫)
 Quanzhen School (全真教)
 Peach Blossom Island (桃花島)
 Duan family of Dali (大理國段氏)
 Xianxia School (仙霞派)
 Five Lakes School (五湖門)
 Iron Palm Gang (鐵掌幫)
 Mount Changbai School (長白山派)
 White Camel Manor (白駝山莊)
 Ke family of Lanzhou (蘭州柯家)

 The Return of the Condor Heroes
 Ancient Tomb School (古墓派)
 Quanzhen School (全真教)
 Beggars' Gang (丐幫)
 Peach Blossom Island (桃花島)
 Duan family of Dali (大理國段氏)
 Shaolin School (少林派)
 Lu Family Manor (陸家莊)
 Iron Palm Gang (鐵掌幫)
 Passionless Valley (絕情谷)
 Vajra School (金剛宗)

 The Heaven Sword and Dragon Saber
 Wudang School (武當派)
 Ming Cult (明教)
 Emei School (峨嵋派)
 Shaolin School (少林派)
 Kunlun School (崑崙派)
 Kongtong School (崆峒派)
 Mount Hua School (華山派)
 Beggars' Gang (丐幫)
 Blue Dragon School of Goguryeo (高麗青龍派)
 Shaolin School of the Western Regions (西域少林)
 Vajra School of the Western Regions (西域金剛門)
 Sharks' Gang (海鯊幫)
 Giant Whale Gang (巨鯨幫)
 Divine Fist School (神拳門)
 Vajra School (金剛門)
 Five Phoenixes Saber School (五鳳刀門)
 Dragon Gate Security Service (龍門鏢局)
 Crouching Tiger Security Service (虎踞鏢局)
 Puyang Security Service (普陽鏢局)
 Yunyan Security Service (雲燕鏢局)

 Ode to Gallantry
 Heroes' Island (俠客島)
 Shaolin School (少林派)
 Wudang School (武當派)
 Changle Gang (長樂幫)
 Snowy Mountain School (雪山派)
 Golden Crow School (金烏派)
 Xuansu Manor (玄素莊)
 Sky-scraping Cliff (摩天崖)
 Golden Saber Fort (金刀寨)

 The Smiling, Proud Wanderer
 Five Mountain Sword Schools Alliance (五嶽劍派)
 Mount Hua School (華山派)
 (South) Mount Heng School (衡山派)
 (North) Mount Heng School (恆山派)
 Mount Song School (嵩山派)
 Mount Tai School (泰山派)
 Sun Moon Holy Cult (日月神教)
 Shaolin School (少林派)
 Wudang School (武當派)
 Beggars' Gang (丐幫)
 Qingcheng School (青城派)
 Golden Saber School (金刀門)
 Fuwei Security Service (福威鏢局)
 Yellow River Gang (黃河幫)

 Sword Stained with Royal Blood
 Mount Hua School (華山派)
 Five Poisons Cult (五毒教)
 Diancang School (點蒼派)
 Taibai School (太白派)
 Qingliang Monastery (清涼寺)
 Iron Sword School (鐵劍門)
 Xiandu School (仙都派)
 Chess Deities School (棋仙派)
 Green Bamboo Gang (青竹幫)
 Poyang Gang (鄱陽幫)
 Ferocious Tiger Ridge Fort (惡虎溝山寨)
 Leopard Slaying Ridge Fort (殺豹崗山寨)
 Flying Tiger Fort (飛虎寨)
 Flying Tiger Valley Fort (飛虎峪山寨)
 Yellow Stone Slope Fort (黃石坡山寨)
 Thousands Willow Manor (千柳莊)
 Louxia School (棲霞派)
 Bohai School (渤海派)
 Golden Dragon Gang (金龍幫)
 Soaring Dragon Gang (游龍幫)
 Befriend Security Service (會友鏢局)
 Ever Victorious Security Service (永勝鏢局)
 Golden Serpent Camp (金蛇營)

 The Deer and the Cauldron
 Heaven and Earth Society (天地會)
 Mystic Dragon Cult (神龍教)
 Kingdom of Tungning (臺灣鄭氏王朝)
 Shaolin School (少林派)
 Wudang School (武當派)
 Beggars' Gang (丐幫)
 Kunlun School (崑崙派)
 House of Prince Mu (沐王府)
 Wangwu School (王屋派)
 Mount Wuyi School (武夷派)
 Qingliang Monastery (清涼寺)
 Iron Sword School (鐵劍門)
 Golden Crown School (金頂門)

 A Deadly Secret
 Blood Saber School (血刀門)

 Blade-dance of the Two Lovers
 Weixin Security Service (威信鏢局)

 White Horse Neighs in the Western Wind
 Puwei Security Service (普威鏢局)

 The Book and the Sword
 Red Flower Society (紅花會)
 Wudang School (武當派)
 Iron Courage Manor (鐵膽莊)
 Shaolin School (少林派)
 Southern Shaolin School (南少林)
 Yan Family Fist School (言家拳)
 Songyang School (嵩陽派)
 Dragon Gate Gang (龍門幫)

 The Young Flying Fox
 Shaolin School (少林派
 King of Herbs School (藥王門)
 Flying Steeds Security Service (飛馬鏢局)
 Eight Trigrams School (八卦門)
 Taiji School (太極門)
 Baji School (八極門)
 Hua Fist School (華拳門)
 Heavenly Dragon School (天龍門)
 Zhenyuan Security Service (鎮遠鏢局)
 Zhong family of Ebei (鄂北鬼見愁鍾家)
 Five Tigers School (五虎門)
 Maple Leaf Manor (楓葉莊)
 Skanda School (韋陀門)
 Shang Family Castle (商家堡)
 Fox Volant of the Snowy Mountain
 Beggars' Gang (丐幫)
 Heavenly Dragon School (天龍門)
 Qingzang School (青藏派)
 Wuji School (無極門)
 Baihui Monastery (百會寺)
 Pingtong Security Service (平通鏢局)
 Yinma River Fort (飲馬川山寨)

Works of Gu Long

 Juedai Shuangjiao
 Yihua Palace (移花宮)
 Villains' Valley (惡人谷)
 Twelve Star Signs (十二星象)
 Lu Xiaofeng Series
 Qingyilou (青衣樓)
 Kingdom of the Golden Bird (大金鵬國)
 Mount Ba Sword School (巴山劍派)
 Phantoms' Manor (幽靈山莊)
 Black Tiger Hall (黑虎堂)
 Demonic Cult (魔教)
 Twelve Linked Fortress (十二連環塢)
 Chu Liuxiang Series
 Beggars' Gang (丐幫)
 Holy Water Palace (神水宮)
 Jade Sword Manor (玉劍山莊)
 Xiaoli Feidao Series
 Gold and Money Gang (金錢幫)
 Plum Manor (梅莊)
 Black Hand (黑手)
 Demonic Cult (魔教)
 Dead Warriors of Qingcheng (青城死士)

 Other works of Gu Long
 Tang Clan (唐門)
 Thunderbolt Hall (霹靂堂)
 Green Dragon Society (青龍會)
 Wolf Mountain (狼山)
 Six Fans Gate (六扇門)
 Hall of the Gods (諸神殿)
 Tian Zong (天宗)
 Puppets' Mountain Manor (玩偶山莊)
 Tian Zun (天尊)
 Heaven Forsaken Nunnery (天棄庵)
 Holy Silkworm Cult (天蠶教)
 Killers' Manor (殺人莊)
 Soul Ensnaring Beauty Palace (銷魂媚宮)
 Heavenly Dragon School (天龍門)
 Five Elements Demonic Palace (五行魔宮)
 Great Banner School (大旗門)
 Mohist School (墨家)
 Rulers' Valley (帝皇谷)
 Xiasan School (下三門)
 Red Shoes (紅鞋子)
 Poison Consuming Cult (食毒教)
 Magnificent Lion Hall (雄獅堂)
 Forest of Delight (快活林)
 Great Wind Hall (大風堂)
 Chopsticks Island, Sun and Moon City (筷子島，日月城)
 Sun and Moon Island, Night-less City (日月島, 不夜城)

Works of Liang Yusheng

 Baifa Monü Zhuan (白髮魔女傳)
 Wudang School (武當派)
 Mount Heaven School (天山派)
 Shaolin School (少林派)
 Emei School (峨嵋派)
 Heavenly Dragon School of Tibet (西藏天龍派)
 Kunlu Sword School (昆盧劍派)
 Songyang School (嵩陽派)
 Taiji School (太極派)
 Chang'an Security Service (長安鏢局)
 Fengsha Castle (風砂堡)
 Dragon Gate Gang (龍門幫)
 Tang School (唐門)

 Qijian Xia Tianshan (七劍下天山)
 Mount Tian School (天山派)
 Wudang School (武當派)
 Heaven and Earth Society (天地會)
 Mount Changbai School (長白山派)
 Zhongnan School (終南派)
 Xizang tianlong Pai (西藏天龍派)
 Wu Family Village (武家莊)
 Wuwei Security Service (武威鏢局)
 Iron Fan Gang (鐵扇幫)
 Five Long Gang (五龍幫)
 Qingyang Gang (青陽幫)

 Xiagu Danxin (俠骨丹心)
 Wudang School (武當派)
 Heaven Demons' Jiao/ TianmoJiao(天魔教)
 Six Harmonies Gang (六合幫)
 Red Tassel Society (紅纓會)

Works of Huang Yi
 Da Tang Shuanglong Zhuan (大唐雙龍傳)
 Cihang Jingqi (慈航靜齋)
 Yingui School (陰癸派)
 Li Fa (李閥)
 Song Fa (宋閥)

Others

 Changshandao
 Church of Maitreya the King of the Universe (宇宙弥勒皇教)
 Church of the Big Sword (大刀会)
 Church of the Great Harmony (大同会)
 Great Simplicity (大易教)
 Dongyue Hui
 Gengshen Hui
 Way of the Kneeling to Incense (跪香道)
 Holy Church of the Middle Flower (中华圣教)
 Red Three (红三教)
 Way of the Imperial Pole (皇极道)
 Way of the Yellow Immortal (黄仙道)
 Way of Flowers and Fasting (华斋道)
 Way of the Old Source (旧根道)
 Way of the Venerable Master (老君道)
 Way of the Venerable Men (老人道)
 Mount Li Maternism (骊山老母教)
 Gate of the Universal Change (普化门)
 Way of the Universal Help (普济道)
 Universal Judgement (普度教), Way of the Universal Judgment (普度道)
 Qixingism
 Qiugongdao
 Way of Men Learning the Goodness (人学好道)
 Way of the Three Peaks (三峰道)
 Way of the Sages and the Immortals (圣仙道)
 Way of the Godly Gate (神门道)
 Way of the Four Manifestations (四方道)
 Suibiandao
 Way of the Heavenly Light (天光道)
 Way of the Heavenly Flower (天花道)
 Way of the Heavenly Bright (天明道)
 Way of the Temple of the Heavenly Immortals (天仙庙道)
 Way of the Endless Whole or Surefire Way (万全道)
 Wugong Hui
 Church of the Small Sword (小刀会)
 True School of the Mysterious Gate (玄门真宗)
 Yinjiezhi Hui
 Yuanshuai Hui
 Gate of the Jade Vacuity (玉虚门)
 Way of the Middle Abode (中方道)
 Zhongjiao Daoyi Hui
 Way of the Golden Mean (中庸道)
 Heavenly House of Filial Loyalty (忠孝天府)
 Zhutian Hui
 Zishen nation
 Eagle Claw Swan Flying School (鷹爪雁行門)
 Wuji Fist School (無極拳門)
 Skanda School (韋陀門)
 Duck Shaped School (鴨形門)
 Thunder and Lightning School (雷電門)
 Erlang Fist School (二郎拳門)
 Huaxinghui (華興會)
 Tongmenghui (中國同盟會)
 Elders Brothers Society (哥老會)
 Society of the Heaven and the Earth (天地會)
  Way of the Eight Trigrams networks (八卦道)
 Dragon Flower Sect (龙花教)
 Abiding Principle Sect (在理教)
 Way of the Children (亥子道)
 Way of the Return to the Root (归根道)
 Church of Virtue (德教会)
 Way of the Mysterious Origin (轩辕道)
 Maitreya teachings (弥勒教)

 Tan Leg School (潭腿門)
 Mystical Finger School (玄指門)
 Doubles School (雙子門)
 Zhongzhua School (中抓門)
 Seven Greens School (七青門)
 Great Sage Monkey Fist School (大聖猴拳門)
 Big Swords Society ( 大刀會)
 Blue Shirts Society (三民主義力行社)
 Yellow Sand Society (黃沙會)
 Flower of Light Sect (燈花教)
 Golden Flag Sect (金幢教)
 Community for the Study of the Way and its Virtue (道德学社)
 Great Way of Maitreya (弥勒大道)
 Life Healing Sect (救世教), also known by its corporate name Community of the Awakening to the Goodness (悟善社)
 Way of the True Emptiness (真空道)
 Confucian Way of the Gods (儒宗神教)
 Harmonious Church of the Three-in-One (三一教协会)
 Black Dragon School (黑龍門)
 Dragon Slaying Gang (屠龍幫)
 Shennong Gang (神農幫)
 Shangqingguan School (上清觀派)
 Wutai School (五台派)
 Eight Immortals School (八仙派)
 Jindandao (金丹道)
 Way of Former Heaven School (先天道)
 Great Sun School (弘阳) or Original Undetermined School (混元)
 Final Salvation Sect (末後一著教)
 Holy Way School (圣道), best known by its incorporate name of Community of the Goodness (同善社)
 Dragon Flower Church of the Heart-bound Heavenly Way (一心天道龙华会)
 Universal Church of the Way and its Virtue (万国道德会)
 Confucian Church (孔教会)
 Lord of Universe Church (天帝教)
 Abiding Principle Sect (在理教)
 Taiyi School (太乙派)
 Mount Taihang School (太行山派)
 Nine Dragons School (九龍派)
 Qinghai School (青海派)
 Mount Wu School (巫山派)
 Yingui School (陰癸派)
 Kongsi (公司)
 Hui (會)
 Way of the Yellow Sky School (黃天道) or Dark Drum (悬鼓)
 Dacheng teaching of Mount Jizu (鸡足山大乘教)
 Way of the Bright Circle (圆明道)
 Way of the Nine Palaces (九宫道)
 Community of the Pure Heart (洗心社)
 Cultivation of the Spirit (气功)
 Confucian religious groups in China mainland (Confucian churches)
 Cloud Returning Manor (歸雲莊)
 Wulang Escort Agency (五郎鏢局)
 Evil Eliminating Alliance (鋤奸盟)
 Jiang Zuo Alliance (江左盟)
 White Lotus Sect (白莲教)
 Red Lantern Sect (紅燈籠)
 Fists of Harmony and Justice (義和團)
 Red Spear Society (紅矛社會)
 Great Vehicle Sect (大乘教) or Sudden Stillness Sect (圆顿教)
 Church of the Highest Supreme (太上会)
 Consistent Way (一貫道)
 Way of the Jasper Lake (瑤池道)
 Holy Church of the Heavenly Virtue (天德圣教)
 Cultivation of the Wheel of Law (法轮功)
  Holy Church of the Heart-Only (唯心聖教)
 Way of the Return to the One (皈依道), best known by its corporate name of School of the Way of the Return to the One or simply School of the Way (道院)

External links
 Organisations in Gu Long's novels

List of organisations in Wuxia fiction
Wuxia fiction